Szabolcs Bakos (born 4 February 1987) is a professional Hungarian footballer who plays for Csákvár.

External links
 HLSZ 
 

1987 births
Sportspeople from Timișoara
Living people
Hungarian footballers
Association football midfielders
III. Kerületi TUE footballers
Vasas SC players
FC Felcsút players
Bajai LSE footballers
FC Tatabánya players
Csákvári TK players
Budaörsi SC footballers
Nyíregyháza Spartacus FC players
Mosonmagyaróvári TE 1904 footballers
Nemzeti Bajnokság I players
Nemzeti Bajnokság II players
Nemzeti Bajnokság III players